Zoltán Demeter (born December 1, 1963) is a Hungarian Calvinist pastor and politician, member of the National Assembly (MP) for Sajószentpéter (Borsod-Abaúj-Zemplén County Constituency VI) from 2010 to 2014, and for Kazincbarcika (Borsod-Abaúj-Zemplén County Constituency IV) since 2014. He was a member of the Committee on Human Rights, Minority, Civic and Religious Affairs and Committee on Education, Science and Research between May 14, 2010 and May 5, 2014, then Culture Committee between May 6, 2014 and May 7, 2018. He is a member of the Justice Committee since May 6, 2014.

Demeter also served as mayor of Bánhorváti between 1998 and 2014, and was also a member of the General Assembly of Borsod-Abaúj-Zemplén County from 2006 to 2010.

Personal life
He is married and has a daughter, Zsuzsanna and two sons, Zoltán and Ádám.

References

1963 births
Living people
Fidesz politicians
Members of the National Assembly of Hungary (2010–2014)
Members of the National Assembly of Hungary (2014–2018)
Members of the National Assembly of Hungary (2018–2022)
Members of the National Assembly of Hungary (2022–2026)
Mayors of places in Hungary
Hungarian Calvinist and Reformed Christians
People from Ózd